The family of Central Pacific or Central Oceanic languages, also known as Fijian–Polynesian, are a branch of the Oceanic languages.

Classification
Ross et al. (2002) classify the languages as a linkage as follows:

Western 
Rotuman
Western Fijian linkage:  Namosi-Naitasiri-Serua, Western Fijian (Nadroga, Waya)
East Central Pacific linkage 
Eastern Fijian linkage:  Bauan (standard Fijian), Gone Dau, Lauan and Lomaiviti
Polynesian family

The West Fijian languages are more closely related to Rotuman, and East Fijian to Polynesian, than they are to each other, but subsequent contact has caused them to reconverge.  Rotuman has been influenced by Polynesian languages.

References

 
Languages of Oceania
Central–Eastern Oceanic languages